Jean Denis, comte Lanjuinais (12 March 175313 January 1827), was a French politician, lawyer, jurist, journalist, and historian.

Biography

Early career
Born in Rennes (Ille-et-Vilaine), Lanjuinais, after a brilliant college career, which made him doctor of laws and a qualified barrister at nineteen, was appointed counsel to the Breton Estates and, in 1775, professor of ecclesiastical law in Rennes. At this period he wrote two important works which, owing to the distracted state of public affairs, remained unpublished, Institutiones juris ecciesiastici and Praelectiones juris ecclesiastici.

He had begun his career at the bar by pleading against the droit du colombier (feudal monopoly on dovecotes), and when he was sent by his fellow-citizens to the Estates-General of 1789 he demanded the abolition of nobility and the substitution of the Royal title king of the French and the Navarrese for king of France and Navarre, and helped to establish the Civil Constitution of the Clergy.

On 7 November 1789, he requested that the ministers not be members of Parliament at the same time. Since the regulation found a majority, he was able to prevent an increase in Mirabeau's power that sought to take over a ministerial post.

Convention and clandestinity
Elected to the National Convention in September 1792, he developed moderate, even reactionary views, becoming one of the fiercest opponents of Montagnards - although he never wavered in his support for the French Republic. He refused to vote for the death of Louis XVI, alleging that the nation had no right to despatch a vanquished prisoner.

His daily attacks on The Mountain resulted, on 15 April 1793, in a demand by the Paris Commune for his exclusion from the assembly, but Lanjuinais remained implacable - when the Parisian populace under François Hanriot invaded the convention on 2 June, he renewed his defiance of the victorious party. Placed under arrest with the Girondists, he escaped to Rennes where he drew up a pamphlet denouncing the Montagnard Constitution under the curious title Le Dernier Crime de Lanjuinais ("The Latest Crime of Lanjuinais", Rennes, 1793). Pursued by Jean-Baptiste Carrier, who was sent to stamp out resistance in the west, he lay hidden until some time after the outbreak of the Thermidorian Reaction (July 1794), but he was readmitted to the convention on 8 March 1795.

Later career
He maintained his liberal and independent attitude in the Council of Ancients of the French Directory, the Senate of the Consulate and First Empire, and the Chamber of Peers, being president of the upper house during the Hundred Days. Together with Gui-Jean-Baptiste Target, Joseph-Marie Portalis and others he founded under the Empire an academy of legislation in Paris, and lectured on Roman law.

Closely associated with oriental scholars, and a keen student of oriental religions, he entered the Académie des Inscriptions in 1808. After the Bourbon Restoration, Lanjuinais consistently defended the principles of constitutional monarchy, but most of his time was given to religious and political subjects. He was President of the Chamber of Representatives from 4 June to 13 July 1815. Comte Lanjuinans died in Paris.

Works
Besides many contributions to periodical literature he wrote, among other works:
Constitutions de la Nation française (1819)
Appréciation du projet de loi relatif aux trois concordats (1806, 6th ed. 1827) - a defence of Gallicanism
Études biographiques et littéraires sur Antoine Arnauld, P. Nicole et Jacques Necker (1823).

Family
His son, Victor Ambroise, vicomte de Lanjuinais (1802–1869), was also a politician, becoming a deputy in 1838. His interests lay chiefly in financial questions and in 1849 he became minister of commerce and agriculture in the cabinet of Odilon Barrot. He wrote a Notice historique sur la vie et les ouvrages du comte de Lanjuinais, which was prefixed to an edition of his fathers Œuvres (4 vols., 1832).

Notes

References
 In turn, it cites as references:
François Victor Alphonse Aulard, Les Orateurs de la Législative et de la Convention (Paris, 1885–1886)
J. M. Quérard, La France littéraire, vol. iii. (1829).
A. Robert and G. Cougny, Dictionnaire des parlementaires, vol. ii. (1890)

1827 deaths
1753 births
Burials at Père Lachaise Cemetery
Deputies to the French National Convention
Counts Lanjuinais
19th-century French historians
French journalists
French jurists
19th-century French  lawyers
French orientalists
Members of the Académie des Inscriptions et Belles-Lettres
Members of the Chamber of Representatives (France)
Peace commissioners of the French Provisional Government of 1815
Peers of France
Writers from Rennes
University of Rennes alumni
18th-century jurists